Krazy House is an upcoming Dutch comedy film. It is written, directed, and co-produced by Steffen Haars and Flip van der Kuil in their English-language feature debut. Shot on location in Amsterdam, the film stars Nick Frost, Kevin Connolly and Alicia Silverstone. Maarten Swart is producer for Kaap Holland Films.

Synopsis
In the 1990s, a religious home maker Bernie (Frost) and his family suddenly discover the workmen in his house are Russian criminals prepared to tear the house apart looking for loot.

Cast
 Nick Frost as Bernie
 Kevin Connolly
 Alicia Silverstone
 Gaite Jansen
 Walt Klink
 Jan Bijvoet
 Chris Peters
 Matti Stooker

Production

Development
Writer-directors “Steffen & Flip” (Steffen Haars and Flip van der Kuil) co-produce alongside Maarten Swart for Kaap Holland Film who have Jorn Baars serving as executive producer, along with Todd Brown of XYZ Films. Splendid Films is handling distribution of the film in the Benelux region. The project had support from the Netherlands Film Production Incentive who revealed in 2020 they had given €526,995 to the project. Additional support came from the Netherlands Film Fund and the Abraham Tuschinski Fund Foundation.

Filming
Principal photography took place in Amsterdam in mid-January 2022.  Filming wrapped prior to XYZ Films taking on North American sales for the film at the European Film Market in February 2023. Lead actor Nick Frost was quoted by Variety as saying the production was a “completely bonkers project to be a part of and I’ve absolutely loved every minute of it.” Silverstone told The Hollywood Reporter “I had a ball in Amsterdam, making a film with these amazing interesting filmmakers”.

References

External links

Upcoming films
Dutch comedy films
Films shot in Amsterdam
English-language films
English-language Benelux films
English-language Dutch films
2020s English-language films